Faroe may refer to:
 Faroe Islands, an archipelago in the North Atlantic and a part of the Kingdom of Denmark
Faroese people
 Faroese language
 Danish ship Færøe
 Fårö, an island off Gotland, Sweden
 Farø, an island south of Zealand, Denmark

See also 
 Pharaoh (disambiguation)